Martin Harrer (born 19 May 1992) is an Austrian footballer who plays as a midfielder, winger or forward for Grazer AK.

References

External links
 

1992 births
Living people
Austrian footballers
FK Austria Wien players
SV Grödig players
FC Juniors OÖ players
LASK players
SC Rheindorf Altach players
FC Wacker Innsbruck (2002) players
FC Voluntari players
Grazer AK players
2. Liga (Austria) players
Austrian Football Bundesliga players
Liga I players
Association football forwards
Association football wingers
Association football midfielders
Austrian expatriate footballers
Austrian expatriate sportspeople in Romania
Expatriate footballers in Romania
People from Voitsberg
Footballers from Styria